The Frankenmuth Credit Union Event Center (Formerly Birch Run Expo Center) was a 2,500 seat multi-purpose arena in Birch Run, Michigan. However, it is now closed and has been sold to Camping World as one of their largest showrooms. Prior to 2002, it was the first NHL Skate center. Due to lack of interest, it was converted into its present form.  It was also the home of the Great Lakes Storm from 2002 to 2005.

It is now used for trade shows, conventions and other events, such as gun and knife shows and music festivals. It was operated by Oak View Group Facilities until 2020 when it was sold to Camping World.

History 
Built in 1997, the NHL opened the first of 100 planned local hockey arenas on September 11, 1997 to help promote interest in skating and hockey. Built by SAI Structural, the original facility included two hockey rinks, eight themed locker rooms, family attractions, a food court, and a NHL FANtasy Zone. By mid-1998, the facility in Birch Run had seen nearly a quarter of a million people since the grand opening. However, by late 1999 the center and the whole "NHL Skate" concept was facing financial difficulties and closed in 2000.

References 

Indoor arenas in Michigan
Sports venues in Michigan
Convention centers in Michigan
Buildings and structures in Saginaw County, Michigan
Event venues established in 1997
1997 establishments in Michigan
Sports venues completed in 1997
Continental Basketball Association venues